Mordechai Sharabi (1908, Shara'b As Salam, Yemen – 1984, Jerusalem) was a rabbi and the founder and rosh yeshiva of Yeshivat Nahar Shalom, a yeshiva for the study of the Kabbalah of Shalom Sharabi, in the Jerusalem neighborhood of Mahane Yehuda. A world-renowned kabbalist, he was accepted by the kabbalists of his time, and had the admiration of Rabbi Ovadia Yosef.

A set of three of his books focusing on remedies that built upon Shalom Sharabi's intentions from verses in selected Psalms were published posthumously.

Notable students
Elazar Mordechai Koenig, spiritual leader of the Breslov Hasidim of Safed.

Burial place
He is buried in Har HaMenuchot, also known as Givat Shaul Cemetery.

References

1908 births
1983 deaths
Yemenite rabbis
Yemeni emigrants to Mandatory Palestine
Israeli people of Yemeni-Jewish descent
Sephardic Haredi rabbis in Israel
20th-century rabbis in Jerusalem
Kabbalists